Renaissance Sportive de Berkane commonly referred to as Nahdat Berkane or RS Berkane for short, is a professional football club based in Berkane, Morocco, that competes in Botola, the top flight of Moroccan football. The club finished in 2nd place in the Botola 2 in the 2011–12 season, which led to the promotion to the first division.

Founded on 1938, the club has traditionally worn an orange home kit since inception. RS Berkane is a well known club for the success of its football section, very popular in and outside the country. Berkane established itself as a major force in both Moroccan and African football.

In domestic football, the club has won 2 trophies; 2 Moroccan Throne Cup. In international competitions, Berkane have won 3 trophies; two CAF Confederation Cup titles and one CAF Super Cup title. Berkane is also, one of the most successful Moroccan club of the 21st century, and is the 3rd most crowned Moroccan club in Africa with 3 titles in official competitions.

History

Founding and early years 
The club was founded in 1938 under the name of Association Sportive de Berkane. In 1953, a team driven by nationalism, was created. It was called Union Sportive Musulmane de Berkane (USMB). But this did not last, after a crisis that broke out in 1955.

In 1959-1960, the Union Sportive Musulmane de Berkane was relegated to the 3rd division. In 1962-1963, it contested the play-off match to move up to the 2nd division. The first meeting was between Union Sportive Musulmane de Berkane, against Wydad de Fès. Berkane was promoted to the top division.

In 1966 it was renamed Union Sportive de Berkane and in the same year, a new club was founded under the name of Chabab Riadhi de Berkane.

In 1971, both teams merged to make Renaissance Sportive de Berkane (Nahdat Berkane). This merger was beneficial for the club, it entered the 1st division in 1977–78.

In 1986, Berkane reached the final for the first time in their history after defeating MC Oujda 2-1 in the semi-final. On 7 September 1987, Berkane lost the 1986 Throne Cup final, after a 4-0 defeat by Kawkab Marrakech.

Return to the Botola 
The RSB regained its spot in the first moroccan division in 2012, under the presidency of Fouzi Lekjaa, who ran the club since 2009.

In 2014, Berkane reached the final for the second time, after a 2-0 victory against Maghreb de Fès. On 18 November, Berkane lost the final after a 2-0 loss against FUS Rabat.

Fouzi Lekjaa era (2018–present) 
In 2018, RS Berkane won its first ever title, the Moroccan Throne Cup after defeating Wydad de Fès In penalties.

Berkane have been making steady progress over the years, culminating with their first continental silverware. After their Confederation Cup campaign ended at the quarter-final stage in 2018, they went further in 2019 and lost the final to Zamalek SC. In the semi-final, Berkane defeated CS Sfaxien 3–2 on aggregate, reaching the final of the CAF Confederation Cup for the first time.

In 2020, Renaissance Sportive De Berkane was crowned Confederation Cup champions, clinching their first continental title in their history. The club beat Egyptians Pyramids 1–0 in the final game at Moulay Abdallah Stadium in Rabat. In the semi-final, Berkane defeated countrymates Hassania Agadir 2–1both scored by Mohamed Aziz.

In the 2022 CAF Confederation Cup, Berkane qualified to the knockout stages after finishing top in the group stages winning three matches, drawing one and losing two.  They defeated Al Masry in the Quarter-finals after an away goal ruled in their favor. In the Semi-final, they faced TP Mazembe, which ended in a 4-2 victory on aggregate. On 20 May 2022, Berkane defeated Orlando Pirates F.C. on penalties to win their second african title. With this win, Berkane will play in the first-ever all-Moroccan CAF Super Cup against 2021–22 CAF Champions League winners, Wydad AC.  On 28 July 2022, Berkane defeated Wydad in penalties in the 2020–21 Moroccan Throne Cup to win its second domestic title.

On 11 September 2022, Berkane defeated Wydad 2-0 to win its first ever CAF Super Cup. They failed to qualify for the 2023 CAF Confederation Cup. However, following a poor start to the season, Abdelhak Benchikha was sacked in November 2022 after three months officially in charge, with Berkane in 13th place in the table.

Grounds 
The stadium has been welcoming the team since 2014 at the Stade Municipal de Berkane, which has a capacity of 10,000 spectators. In 2017, a natural lawn replaced the synthetic turf which dates from the opening of the stadium. On 19 May 2019, it hosted the first leg of the CAF Confederation Cup between Berkane Renaissance and Zamalek SC. It is located in the city of Berkane in the Eastern Rif of Morocco. It now hosts local and international matches (Botola Pro, Caf confederation cup).

The stadium contains: a foyer, a hall of honor, a doping control room, a nursing room, two clothes warehouses, sanitary facilities, a meeting room for referees, and the playing field is covered with artificial grass that includes natural fibres.

Performance in CAF Competitions

CAF Confederation Cup: 7 appearances

2015 – First Round
2018 – Quarter-finals
2019 – Runner-up 
2020 – Champion
2021 – Group stage
2022 – Champion
2023 – Playoff Round
CAF Super Cup 2 apparences

2021 – Runner-up
2022 – Champion

Honours

National
Moroccan Throne Cup
Winners: 2018, 2021
Runner-up: 1987, 2014

International
CAF Confederation Cup
Winners: 2020, 2022
Runner-up: 2019
CAF Super Cup
Winners: 2022
Runner-up: 2021

Current squad

 (captain)

Managers
 Bertrand Marchand (16 October 2012 – 17 June 2013)
 Umberto Barberis (1 July 2013 – 30 October 2013)
 Youssef Lemrini (30 October 2013 – 30 June 2017)
 Mounir Jaouani (1 July 2017 – 2019)
 Tarik Sektioui (2019 – 2021)
 Juan Pedro Benali (2021 – 2021)
 Florent Ibengé (July 2021 – 11 September 2022)
 Abdelhak Benchikha (10 August 2022 – 11 November 2022)
 Amine El Karma (11 November 2022 – present)

References

External links
Club profile – Soccerway
official website
instagram account
Twitter account
Youtube channel
Facebook page

Football clubs in Morocco
1938 establishments in Morocco
Sports clubs in Morocco
RS Berkane
Association football clubs established in 1938
CAF Confederation Cup winning clubs